Plaistow County Grammar School, also known as "Plaistow Grammar" or "PGS", was a local authority mixed gender Grammar school established in 1945 and located on Prince Regent Lane (A112) in Plaistow, in the County Borough of West Ham and then the London Borough of Newham in east London.  It was disestablished in 1972 upon its merging to create a Comprehensive school.

History

The school first opened in 1926 as Plaistow Secondary School on the site in the south of the borough, and was designed to cater for 250 pupils A second quadrangle was completed in 1930 increasing the capacity to 600, reaching a similar enrolment to that of West Ham Secondary School (until 1925 known as West Ham Central Secondary School), its counterpart in the north of the borough. In 1930 the school magazine The Plaistovian (Plaistovian meaning of or belonging to Plaistow) was launched and publication continued until the school was merged in 1972.  Among the initial editorial staff was pupil Norman Price who later became Chairman of the Board of Inland Revenue and obtain a knighthood.

The Latin motto of the original secondary school was  Non Quo, Sed Quomodo. Dr Harold Priestley's book "Plaistow Sec: The Story of a School" credits this to Miss M "Maggie" Lamb, MA, an English teacher who joined the school in 1927 and who translated it as "Not to what end, but how" (also translated as "Not by whom but in what manner"), in other words the end does not justify the means or (colloquially) "It ain't what you do it's the way that you do it".  In the 1950s the motto of the County Borough of West Ham, Deo Confidimus (translated as "In God we trust"), was adopted. After West Ham joined with the County Borough of East Ham and small parts of Barking and Woolwich to form the London Borough of Newham in 1965, the school's motto remained.

Before and during the second world war, pupils and staff were evacuated at various times to (briefly) Wellington in Somerset, then to Weymouth in Dorset, South Molton in Devon, Helston and Newquay, both in Cornwall.

The school became Plaistow Grammar School in September 1945 as a result of the Education Act of 1944, and subsequently Plaistow County Grammar School.

The school's badge was featured in the 16 July 1960 issue (No.1829) of the British comic The Rover.

In 1972, following the 1965 changes in educational infrastructure proposed by the Ministry of Education, the school was merged with Faraday Secondary Modern School of Denmark Street, E13, to become Cumberland Comprehensive School. The name Cumberland Comprehensive was taken from Cumberland Road, which ran past Faraday Secondary Modern and past the Cumberland Road Playing Fields which abutted the grammar school and were routinely used by it for physical education. Cumberland operated across both sites, with the lower school occupying the former Faraday premises and the upper school using the former grammar school buildings.

Houses
Plaistow Secondary School and Plaistow Grammar operated a House system to create competition, rivalry and team spirit. Pupils were allocated to one of four Houses – Barking, Regent, Beckton and Cumberland (named after four roads to the north, east, south and west of the school). Each House had a distinctive colour worn for sports and during physical education.

Admissions
The selective admission to the grammar school was gained through the Eleven plus exam although in some cases pupils were able to transfer from a Secondary modern school on evaluation by the local education authority.

Curriculum
The broad curriculum was focused on academic rather than vocational education, and included languages, sciences, art, and music subjects, culminating in RSA, CSE, GCE O-level and GCE A-level exams, while other certificates were also offered.  Examination results became among the best in the borough, with many pupils gaining entrance to university.

Notable alumni
Paul Bach, journalist
Commander Nick Bracken, OBE, DL, Metropolitan police
Joe Brown, MBE, singer/entertainer
Paul Brush, soccer player
Sir Ben Helfgott, MBE, Olympic weightlifter
Fred Jarvis, CBE, trade unionist
Allan Levene, information technology specialist
Malcolm McFee, actor
Terence Stamp, actor

Current use
Cumberland eventually moved to a single site. The borough of Newham adopted a re-organised sixth form education system, establishing the Newham Sixth Form College which, after some new construction work, moved in to the Prince Regent Lane premises and opened its doors to students in September 1992. The majority of the old, single-storey, Plaistow Grammar classrooms still exist but, over the years, many new buildings have been added by the college.

Further reading
Priestley, Harold (1976)  The Story of a School, 1926–1950,   Plaistow Sec. SIN: B00124OHK2.

References

External links
 EduBase2 (for Cumberland School)

Defunct grammar schools in England
Educational institutions disestablished in 1972
Defunct schools in the London Borough of Newham
Educational institutions established in 1945
1945 establishments in England
1972 disestablishments in England
Plaistow, Newham